Resolution Copper (RCM) is a joint venture owned by Rio Tinto and BHP formed to develop and operate an underground copper mine near Superior, Arizona, U.S. The project targets a deep-seated porphyry copper deposit located under the now inactive Magma Mine. Rio Tinto has reported an inferred resource of 1.624 billion tonnes containing 1.47 percent copper and 0.037 percent molybdenum at depths exceeding . The proposed mine is one of the largest copper resources in North America. Following the passage of the 2015 National Defense Authorization Act, many Native American and conservation groups oppose the copper mine because it will destroy the area above Oak Flat and around the deposit.

Overview
Resolution Copper estimates the $64 billion mining project would run over 60 years and produce 25% of projected future US copper demand for several decades.

Investment
Through 2012 Resolution Copper had invested almost a billion dollars in the Superior project, and planned a $6 billion investment to develop the mine, if the Federal land exchange is approved. Pending approval, the project budget was cut from about $200 million in 2012 to $50 million in 2013. By early 2023, more than $2 billion had been spent on exploratory work and preparation for the project.

Resolution Copper also owns the mineral rights acquired from ASARCO to the Superior East deposit which is another deep-seated porphyry deposit within a mile to the east.

Mining method

The company plans to use block caving which creates subsidence. In an undated report, the company splits subsidence into three categories collectively called "surface impact zones". These are intact zone, fracture zone and cave zone. The cave zone would be 1 miles long and over 850 feet deep.

The company has been exploring solutions for the 1.599 billion tonnes or 19.9 billion cubic feet tailings which will be produced. One possibility is using existing mined out open pits as tailing deposits, a brownfield known as the Pinto Valley mine in Gila County, Arizona or a greenfield site on 12 sections of land on the far northern end of what's known as Superstition Vistas.

Project history
 the project was stalled pending a proposed land swap with the federal government. Resolution Copper has proposed to give the federal government  of environmentally sensitive land in Arizona in exchange for the  oak flat federal parcel, which includes the Oak Flat Campground (protected since 1955) and several outdoor climbing sites including the Mine, Atlantis and the Pond.

In May 2009, Arizona Democratic representative Ann Kirkpatrick introduced legislation in Congress to complete the land swap. The swap then had the support of Arizona's two Republican senators. The swap also has had considerable opposition and may have cost Ann Kirkpatrick her congressional seat in her 2010 loss to Paul Gosar; however, she regained the seat in 2012 and won again in 2014.

In 2013, the proposed land swap was readdressed when Rep. Paul A. Gosar (R, AZ-4) introduced the Southeast Arizona Land Exchange and Conservation Act of 2013 (H.R. 687; 113th Congress). The bill provided that the Apache Leap Cliffs, which rise prominently just east of the town of Superior, remain in federal ownership, and directed the Secretary of the Interior to manage Apache Leap so as to preserve its natural character. The bill required Resolution Copper to surrender any mining rights it has over the Apache Leap cliffs, and deeding 110 acres of private land in the area of cliffs to the federal government.

A rider introduced by John McCain and Jeff Flake in Section 3003 the 2015 National Defense Authorization Act, included the provisions of the stalled Southeast Arizona Land Exchange and Conservation Act. The Act cleared the way for the land swap in which Resolution would receive 2,422 acres of National Forest land in exchange for deeding to the federal government 5,344 acres of private land. The mine would impact an area set aside in 1955 by President Dwight D. Eisenhower which is sacred to the San Carlos Apache Indian Reservation. Both the Oak Flat Campground, an area dotted with petroglyphs and historic and prehistoric sites, and the steep cliffs at Apache Leap would be affected.
In July 2015, a march protesting the land swap arrived in Washington DC.

The initial report was rushed through during the final days of the Donald Trump administration, and under the provisions of Section 3003 ownership was scheduled to occur on March 11, 2021. The Joe Biden administration withdrew the report on March 2 to demand more input from the public and Indigenous nations. On March 18, Representative Raúl Grijalva reintroduced the Save Oak Flat Act for the fourth time, which would repeal the mandate to transfer the land transfer of Oak Flat to Resolution Copper.

Reactions
The San Carlos Apache Tribe, the National Audubon Society in Tucson, the Grand Canyon Chapter of the Sierra Club as well as the National Congress of American Indians have joined in the fight against the Resolution Copper land swap.  Native American groups and conservationists worry about the impact to surrounding areas and have led a strong opposition to the land exchange.  James Anaya, former United Nations special rapporteur on the rights of indigenous peoples, said that without community and tribal support, Rio Tinto should abandon its Resolution Copper mining project.  In 2014,  Secretary of the Interior Sally Jewell said she was "profoundly disappointed with the Resolution Copper land-swap provision, which has no regard for lands considered sacred by nearby Indian tribes".

By January 2015, 104,646 people had signed the petition, "We the People|Stop Apache Land Grab".  Jodi Gillette, Special Assistant to the President for Native American Affairs, quickly gave an official White House response, vowing that the Obama Administration will work with Resolution Copper's parent company Rio Tinto to determine how to work with the tribes to preserve their sacred areas.

In response, Resolution Copper has pledged its commitment to respectful cooperation with the Tribes. The company has funded a new Tribal Monitor Training hosted by the US Forest Service, a program designed to train and employ tribal members in survey work identifying and recording traditional cultural locations alongside archaeologists. Parent Rio Tinto has partnered with Harvard University to produce a case study by The Harvard Project on American Indian Economic Development, studying how mining industries and tribes can increase economic development by establishing a trusting relationship.

Apaches have marched six times in protest of the site, most recently in February 2020. In face of the mounting protests, the Biden administration ultimately pushed back the environmental assessment due to inadequate public and tribal input in March 2021. In a June 2021 op-ed for the Los Angeles Times, the chairman of the San Carlos Apache Tribe objected that it would not only destroy his tribe's cultural heritage, but also the local tourism industry and Arizona's groundwater supply.

See also

 Copper mining in Arizona
 Magma Arizona Railroad
 San Carlos Apache Indian Reservation

References
Notes

Further reading
 Manske, Scott & Paul, Alex (2002) Abstract "Geology of a Major New Porphyry Copper Center in the Superior (Pioneer) District, Arizona" Economic Geology v.97 no.2 pp. 197–220.

External links
 Resolution Copper Mining Website
  

BHP
Copper mines in Arizona
Mining in Arizona
Pinal County, Arizona
Rio Tinto (corporation) subsidiaries
Underground mines in the United States
Environmental justice in the United States
Environmental controversies
Environmental protests in the United States
Indigenous peoples and the environment
Indigenous rights in the United States
Land defender